Daniel Jarrett (November 6, 1886 or 1894 - March 13, 1938) was an actor and screenwriter in the United States. He was the brother of screenwriter and actor Arthur L. Jarrett.

He acted in the 1914 film The Scales of Justice (film), the 1916 film Kennedy Square, the 1917 film Miss Robinson Crusoe, the 1917 film The Slacker and the 1922 film Sunshine Harbor.

Filmography
The Scales of Justice (film) (1914)
Kennedy Square (1916)
Miss Robinson Crusoe (1917)
The Slacker (1917)
Sunshine Harbor (1922) as Dugan
 The Cowboy Millionaire (1935 film), story and screenplay
 Daniel Boone (1936 film), screenplay
 Roll Along, Cowboy (1937), screenplay
 Windjammer (1937 film), screenplay
 Hawaiian Buckaroo (1938)
 Tomahawk (film)''(1951), story

References

19th-century births
1938 deaths
American male film actors
American male silent film actors
20th-century American male actors